Ironidae is a family of nematodes belonging to the order Enoplida.

Genera

Genera:
 Capillaris
 Conilia Gerlach, 1956
 Criptonchus Cobb, 1913

References

Nematodes